The Pacific Rim (Spanish: Titanes del Pacífico) is a Mexican-American franchise that consists of Kaiju-monster installments; including two theatrical films: Pacific Rim (2013) and Pacific Rim Uprising (2018), and an animated television series: Pacific Rim: The Black (2021–2022). The overall plot centers around a future where giant Kaiju monsters arise from an interdimensional portal at the bottom of the Pacific Ocean, and the military response to their attacks. Based on an original story written by Travis Beacham, the franchise expands on his original fictional future by exploring humanity's actions for survival. This franchise was created by Mexican film director Guillermo del Toro.

The original film was met with positive critical and financial reception. The second film was met with mixed critical reception, though it still made a profit at the box office. The franchise expanded with the release of an animated television series which lasted for two seasons, and released exclusively on Netflix. The show was well received by critics and its viewers.

There are plans in development for the franchise to continue.

Films

Pacific Rim (2013)

In 2013, legions of monstrous creatures from another universe known as Kaiju rise from the seas, when a wormhole to another dimension labeled as "The Breach" which opened at the bottom of the Pacific Ocean. As the human race fought their advances, the races of the planet form a resistance and became involved in an all-out war. To thwart the monsters' advances mankind built giant robots named Jaegers, equipped with the technology and weaponry to fight back. Controlled by two pilots linked together via a neural connection to the machines, the human forces have attempted to regain control of the planet called the Pan Pacific Defense Corps. Under the direction of a Jaeger pilot-turned Lead of the combined military named Marshal Stacker Pentecost, the Earth's civilizations withhold complete extinction.

In 2020, years after their initial attack, brothers Yancy and Raleigh Beckett co-pilot a Jaeger to defend Anchorage Alaska from the attack of a powerful Kaiju codenamed "Knifehead". During the battle the creature kills Yancy, while Raleigh takes sole control of the machine and ultimately defeats the monster. Traumatized from the experience and saddened at the passing of his older brother, Raleigh quits the Jaeger program. Now in 2025, humanity is on the verge of defeat. In one last stand against the Kaiju, the future of the human race rests in the hands of Raleigh, and an untested trainee named Mako Mori, who must work together after being recruited by Pentecost to pilot an older model Jaeger of a bygone era. Together, the pair must overcome their differences, in a combined effort close "The Breach" and stop the advances to save the planet.

Pacific Rim Uprising (2018)

In 2035, ten years after the Battle of the Breach successfully closed the portal at the bottom of the Pacific Ocean through which an alien race called the Precursors sent beasts from another dimension to conquer the planet, Jake Pentecost makes a career out of stealing and selling parts of the old Jaeger machines on the Black Market. The once-promising pilot, whose heroic father gave his life to secure the victory against the gigantic Kaiju, abandoned his training only to become involved in the criminal underworld. Despite his efforts to turn away from his upbringing, Pentecost soon finds that he is pulled back into his military position when a new and unstoppable threat begins to rip through cities. With civilization again threatened on the brink of complete obliteration, he seeks to mend broken relationships and reunites with his adoptive sister Mako Mori. Together with the combined forces of the human race, Jake must rise to the occasion and live up to his legendary father's legacy.

Future
In October 2017, DeKnight stated that the plot to a third movie had been written, though its development is dependent on the critical and financial success of Pacific Rim Uprising. The filmmaker stated that plans include expanding the fictional universe into sequels and spin-offs directly tied to previous installments, as well as standalone releases as well; comparing plans to Star Wars and Star Trek. DeKnight later talked about his interest in having the franchise crossover with the MonsterVerse.

Television

In November 2018, an anime-styled animated sequel series was announced to be in development. Craig Kyle and Greg Johnson serve as co-creators and co-showrunners. The plot follows the events of Uprising, and centers around a perfectionist teenage boy and his naïve younger sister, who together pilot an abandoned Jaeger to desperately cross the dangerous landscape inhabited by Kaiju monsters, in an attempt to find their missing parents. The project is a joint-venture production between Legendary Entertainment, Legendary Television, and Polygon Pictures, and released as a Netflix Original Series. The series is distributed via streaming exclusively on Netflix. The series was ordered for two seasons.

The Black culminated with a second and final season, released in April 2022.

Main cast and characters

Additional crew and production details

Reception

Box office and financial performance

Critical and public response

References 

Pacific Rim (franchise)
Kaiju
Mecha films
Monster movies
Giant monster films
Apocalyptic films
Films about nuclear war and weapons
Mass media franchises introduced in 2013
American disaster films
English-language films
Action film franchises
Horror film franchises
Science fiction film franchises
Film franchises introduced in 2013
Fictional universes